AccessBank Tajikistan is a mid-size bank in Tajikistan.  The bank is currently led by chairman Katharina Sсhaсhtner.

AccessBank was established with the financial support of a number of European development banks and is 100% foreign-owned, including shareholders Access Microfinance Holding AG (63.429%), European Bank for Reconstruction and Development – (13.714%), International Finance Corporation – (13.714%) and  KfW Development Bank – (9.143%).

In 2019, AccessBank Tajikistan joined the Bank Arvand.

References

External links
 Official website

Banks of Tajikistan
Banks established in 2010
Banks disestablished in 2019
2010 establishments in Tajikistan